Lingyan Mountain is located in western Mudu town in the Wuzhong District of Suzhou, Jiangsu, China. It is famous for an abundance of Yuhua Stones. There are various animals on and around the mountain. There are several Buddhist temples on the top of the mountain. Every year, visitors from all over China come to view the landscape and sika deer.

Since June 2021, the mountain has been served by Lingyanshan station of the Suzhou Rail Transit Line 5.

References

Mountains of Suzhou
Wuzhong District